Dropped is the second studio album by American rock band Mind Funk. The title is a reference to the loss of their recording contract with Epic Records prior to recording the album.

Production
The band was about to start recording sessions for the album when they were informed that Epic Records had dropped them. Producer Terry Date encouraged the band to stay together, record the album in Seattle, and use a cheaper and more live recording style.

Critical reception
Trouser Press called the album "competent and tasteful but undistinguished", writing that "[guitarists] Everman and Svitek whip up smartly modulated guitar noise bolstered by a strong, slightly stiff rhythm section and functional tunes." The Washington Post wrote: "Boasting an effectively off-kilter weave of standard-issue grunge and unexpected psychedelic flourishes, Dropped is equal parts trippy impressionism ('11 Ton Butterfly') and brooding introspection ('Drowning')." The Tampa Bay Times wrote that the band "musters enough intensity to overcome its shortcomings in the originality department."

Track listing
 "Goddess"– 5:17
 "Closer"– 5:31
 "Drowning"– 6:32
 "In the Way Eye"– 5:40
 "Zootiehead"– 4:14
 "Wisteria"– 7:01
 "Mama, Moses and Me"– 4:31
 "11 Ton Butterfly"– 6:30
 "Hogwallow"– 4:58
 "Billygoat"– 5:16
 "Hollow" 8:36

Personnel
 Patrick Dubar – lead vocals
 Louis Svitek – lead guitar, backing vocals
 Jason Everman – lead guitar, backing vocals
 John Monte – bass, backing vocals
 Shawn Johnson – drums
 Terry Date – producer

References

Mind Funk albums
1993 albums
Albums produced by Terry Date